Sheikh Mohammed bin Rashid Al Maktoum (born 15 July 1949) is an Emirati politician and royal who is the current ruler of Dubai, and serves as the vice president, prime minister, and minister of defence of the United Arab Emirates. He is the third son of Sheikh Rashid bin Saeed Al Maktoum, former vice president of the UAE and ruler of Dubai. Mohammed succeeded his brother Maktoum as vice president and ruler following the latter's death in 2006.

A billionaire, Mohammed generates most of his income from real estate and is described as "one of the world's most prominent real estate developers". Land which is owned by him is managed as an asset of the state. There is a blurred line between the assets of the government of Dubai and those of the ruling Al Maktoum family. He oversaw the growth of Dubai into a global city, as well as the launch of a number of government-owned enterprises including Emirates Airline, DP World, and the Jumeirah Group. Some of these are held by Dubai Holding. Mohammed has overseen the development of certain projects in Dubai including the creation of a technology park, a free economic zone, Dubai Internet City, Dubai Media City, the Dubai International Finance Centre, the Palm Islands and the Burj Al Arab hotel. He also drove the construction of Burj Khalifa, the tallest building in the world.

Mohammed is the absolute ruler of Dubai and the prime minister of the UAE, a position appointed by the president. The government is autocratic, as there are no democratic institutions, and internal dissent is prohibited. It is characterized by scholars as authoritarian.

On 5 March 2020, a British court ruled that on the balance of probabilities, Mohammed had abducted two of his daughters, Shamsa and Latifa, and had threatened his former wife, the Jordanian princess Haya bint Hussein. Allegedly, Shamsa and Latifa were forcibly medicated while held in Dubai under Sheikh Mohammed's orders since 2000 and 2018, respectively. On 16 February 2021, BBC's Panorama broadcast a documentary featuring Sheikha Latifa's video messages that she made secretly under enforced detention in Dubai on the orders of Sheikh Mohammed.

Mohammed is an equestrian and is the founder of the Maktoum family-owned Godolphin stable and the owner of Darley, a thoroughbred breeding operation, operational in six countries. In 2012, he rode the horse Madji Du Pont 160 km to take the FEI World Endurance Championship.

Early life 
Sheikh Mohammed is the third of four sons of Sheikh Rashid bin Saeed Al Maktoum, ruler of Dubai. The Al Maktoum family is Dubai's ruling family and descendants of the House of Al-Falasi, of which Sheikh Mohammed is the tribal leader. His mother was Sheikha Latifa bint Hamdan Al Nahyan, daughter of former ruler of Abu Dhabi Sheikh Hamdan bin Zayed bin Khalifa Al Nahyan. Mohammed's early life was not grand. He grew up in a house without any electricity during his early years and the family sometimes had to sleep together in one room with a fan. A hundred people or more lived in his house, including guards and slaves.

Education 
From the age of four, Mohammed was privately tutored in Arabic and Islamic Studies. In 1955, he began his formal education at Al Ahmedia School. At the age of 10, he moved to Al Shaab School, and two years later, went to Dubai Secondary School. In 1966, with his cousin Mohammed bin Khalifa Al Maktoum, he attended the Bell Educational Trust's English Language School in the United Kingdom. He subsequently studied at the Mons Officer Cadet School in Aldershot, passing out with the sword of honour as the top Commonwealth student. He also travelled to Italy to train as a pilot.

Political career

Dubai Police 

On Mohammed's return from military training to Dubai, his father appointed him as the head of the Dubai Police Force and the Dubai Defence Force (which later became a part of the Union Defence Force) when he was only 20 years old.

Minister of Defence 
As a young man, in January 1968, Mohammed was present when his father Rashid and Sheikh Zayed bin Sultan Al Nahyan first met in the desert between Dubai and Abu Dhabi at Argoub El Sedira to agree to the formation of a union of emirates following British notification of intent to withdraw from the Trucial States. When the new nation of the United Arab Emirates was founded on 2 December 1971, he became its first minister of defence at the age of 22.

A period of uncertainty and instability followed the Union of the United Arab Emirates, including skirmishes between tribes over property, straddling new borders. On 24 January 1972, the exiled former ruler of the Emirate of Sharjah, Saqr bin Sultan Al Qasimi, led an insurrectionist coup against the ruler, Khalid bin Mohammed Al Qasimi. Following a spirited firefight between the Union Defence Force and Saqr's forces – mostly Egyptian mercenaries who had entered the UAE through Ras Al Khaimah – Sheikh Mohammed accepted Saqr's surrender. Sheikh Khalid had been killed in the action, leading to the accession of his brother Sultan as ruler of Sharjah. Mohammed delivered Saqr to Sheikh Zayed, who put him under house arrest in Al Ain.

In 1973, Sheikh Mohammed was involved in protracted negotiations with the hijackers of JAL 404, led by Japanese Red Army member Osamu Maruouka, which landed in Dubai after being hijacked as it departed Schiphol Airport. Although unsuccessful in obtaining the release of the hostages (they were finally freed, and the 747 blown up, in Libya), he was more successful in a later negotiation with the three hijackers of KLM 861, who released the balance of their hostages and handed over the plane in return for safe passage. In 1977, Mohammed oversaw the integration of Dubai's military forces with those of the other emirates.

Crown Prince of Dubai 

On 3 January 1995, Sheikh Mohammed's elder brother Maktoum signed two decrees appointing him and his brother Hamdan as Crown Prince of Dubai. Mohammed, at the time of being appointed crown prince, also served as minister of defence, a position he held since 9 December 1971, following his time as chief of the Dubai Police Force.

Mohammed created the Dubai Shopping Festival in late 1995, an annual event that has become a significant contributor to the economy of the UAE.

In 2001, Sheikh Mohammed ordered the arrest of Obaid Saqr bin-Busit, the head of Dubai Customs and the chairman of the World Customs Association.

Ruler of Dubai, Vice President and Prime Minister 
After roughly a decade of de facto rule, Mohammed became the ruler of Dubai on 4 January 2006, upon the death of his brother Maktoum. The following day, the Federal National Council selected him as the new vice president of the UAE. On 11 February, the Council approved President Khalifa bin Zayed Al Nahyan's nomination of Sheikh Mohammed for Prime Minister.

Mohammed is the absolute monarch of Dubai. The government is described as autocratic, as there are no democratic institutions, and internal dissent is prohibited. Mohammed is Prime Minister of the UAE, which scholars characterize as authoritarian. According to human rights organizations, there are systematic human rights violations, including the torture and forced disappearance of government critics. There is a blurred line between the assets of the state of Dubai and those of the Al Maktoum ruling family.
	 
Mohammed issued a law in 2006 to form the Dubai Establishment for Women Development, renamed by law in 2009 as the Dubai Women's Establishment. He also formed the UAE Gender Balance Council in 2015.

On 19 October 2020, Mohammed led the UAE Council of Ministers meeting that ratified a peace agreement with Israel, normalizing diplomatic relationships between the countries. The council, again headed by Sheikh Mohammed, approved the decision to found an Emirati embassy in Tel Aviv in January, and Mohammed swore in the first Emirati ambassador to Israel, Mahmoud Al Khajah, a month later.

Space exploration 
Mohammed founded the Mohammed bin Rashid Space Centre in 2015, which announced it would be launching a spacecraft to Mars to study the planet’s atmosphere; He stated that the planet was chosen for its "epic challenge," saying it would benefit the Emirati economy. He announced that the mission would be called Hope after a public vote, as the name would "send a message of optimism to millions of young Arabs," since "Arab civilisation once played a great role in contributing to human knowledge, and [would] play that role again."

Mohammed announced that the Hope mission had succeeded at orbit insertion on 9 February 2021, and shared the first picture the probe had captured days later. Hope became the first Arab mission to space, as well as the first of three missions in July 2020—the others from the US and China—to arrive at Mars.

In 2020, Mohammed announced a second mission, this one to the moon. The Emirates Lunar Mission will use a rover reportedly built entirely in the UAE, and is scheduled for 2022.

Business career 

Mohammed has overseen the creation and growth of a number of businesses and economic assets of Dubai, with a number held by two companies under his ownership, Dubai World and Dubai Holding. According to the laws of Dubai, the ruling family owns all undeveloped land in Dubai, which has allowed the family to prosper from real estate development. During Mohammed's rule, Dubai has seen enormous population growth, causing a real estate boom in Dubai. The boom was in part facilitated by Mohammed's 2002 decree that foreigners would be allowed to purchase property in Dubai.

Mohammed established Dubai World by decree, leading to the company's launch on 2 July 2006, as a holding company consolidating a number of assets including logistics company, DP World, property developer Nakheel Properties, and investment company Istithmar World. With more than 50,000 employees in over 100 cities around the globe, the group has real estate, logistics and other business investments in the United States, the United Kingdom, and South Africa. The company is owned by the government of Dubai.

Mohammed's personal corporate portfolio is the Dubai Holding Group, which is involved in a variety of investments. Dubai Holding benefits from its association with the ruling family of Dubai, and is given free land by the Dubai government.

Mohammed was responsible for the launch of Emirates Airline.

Launch of Emirates Airline 
Through the 1970s, as well as his role as head of Dubai Defence Force and UAE minister of defence, Mohammed oversaw Dubai's energy resources and was in charge of Dubai Civil Aviation. It was in this latter role, in March 1985, that he founded Emirates Airline, tasking then-head of dnata, Maurice Flanagan, with launching a new airline to be called Emirates after a dispute with Gulf Air over Dubai's 'Open Skies' policy. The launch budget of the airline was $10 million (the amount Flanagan said he needed to launch an airline) and its inaugural flight took place on 25 October 1985. Mohammed appointed his uncle Ahmed bin Saeed as chairman of the new company. A further $75 million in facilities and materials was provided, but Emirates has always maintained that it has received no further subsidies throughout the company's meteoric growth to become one of the world's leading airlines.

In 1989, Mohammed inaugurated the first Dubai Airshow. In 2013, the exhibition had grown to over 1,000 exhibiting companies, and was the venue for Emirates' placement of the largest aeroplane order in history, with $99 billion combined orders with Airbus for its A380 and Boeing for its 777X.

Burj Al Arab and Jumeirah 

The Burj Al Arab was inaugurated in December 1999. The hotel, constructed from a design by WS Atkins in response to a brief from Mohammed to create "a truly iconic" building, styles itself as "the world's most luxurious hotel". It was constructed on an island offshore from the Jumeirah Beach Hotel, the first property managed by Jumeirah, the hotel management company launched by Mohammed in 1997 and headed by ex-Trust House Forte executive Gerald Lawless. While work began on both hotels at the same time, the island to house the Burj Al Arab required three years to build before construction began above ground. Jumeirah's international expansion, driven after it became part of Dubai Holding in 2004, encompasses 22 hotels in ten countries.

Dubai Internet City and TECOM 
On 29 October 1999, Mohammed announced Dubai Internet City, a technology hub and free trade zone. Offering companies long leases, full ownership, and fast access to government services, DIC grew from its first tenants in October 2000, to a current zone employing about 15,000 people. In November 2000, it was joined by Dubai Media City, a content and media production-free zone, which is co-located with DIC. The launch of DIC came with assurances from Mohammed regarding media freedoms. In 2007, he issued a decree banning the imprisonment of journalists following an incident in which local journalists were accused of libel and sentenced to jail terms.

Palm Islands 

The Palm Islands were developed by Nakheel Properties, which Mohammed founded.

Interests, activities and philanthropic work

Mohammed bin Rashid Global initiatives (MBRGI) 
The Mohammed bin Rashid Global Initiatives is a charitable foundation which consolidates the work of some 33 charitable foundations, entities and initiatives which, together, implement more than 1,400 development programs, contributing to the support of more than 130 million people in 116 countries in collaboration with over 280 strategic partners, including governmental institutions, private sector companies, as well as regional and international organizations.

Mohammed bin Rashid School of Government 
The Mohammed bin Rashid School of Government (previously the Dubai School of Government) is an academic and research institution in the area of public policy and administration.

Aid to Palestine 
Mohammed made a grant of 600 houses to Gaza following the 2008–2009 Gaza war.

Conjoined twin surgery 
In 2005, Mohammed made an offer to pay to separate conjoined twins in India, but the offer was declined for fears the surgery was too risky.

Aiding mosque construction in the Netherlands 
In 2000, Mohammed donated €4 million for the construction of the Essalaam Mosque in Rotterdam, the Netherlands.

In June 2017, two new initiatives were added to the Mohammed Bin Rashid Al Maktoum Global Initiatives, within the "Empowering Communities" sector, namely the International Institute for Tolerance and the Sheikh Mohammed Bin Rashid Award for Tolerance. In this respect, Sheikh Mohammed issued Law No. (9) of 2017 on the Establishment of the International Institute for Tolerance and Decree No. (23) of 2017 on the Formation of a Board of Trustees and Decree No. (28) of 2017 on the Appointment of a Managing Director for the International Institute for Tolerance. In this respect, Law No. (9) of 2017 includes the launch of the Sheikh Mohammed Bin Rashid Award for Tolerance, administered in accordance with the provisions and statute of said Law. Hence, the establishment of the International Institute for Tolerance aims at instilling a spirit of tolerance across the community, building a cohesive society, strengthening the UAE's standing and position as a model of tolerance, as well as renouncing extremism and all forms of discrimination among people on the basis of religion, sex, race, color or language, in addition to honoring all entities and institutions contributing to the promotion of tolerance and open, interfaith dialogue.

Sporting interests 
Sheikh Mohammed is a major figure in international thoroughbred horse racing and breeding. He owns Darley Stud, the biggest horse breeding operation in the world with farms in the United States, Ireland, England, and Australia. In 1985 he bought the Irish thoroughbred Park Appeal for an undisclosed sum at the end of her second season. She went on to produce at least nine winners from twelve foals and is the ancestor of many successful horses.

Mohammed had raced horses as a child (he would share his breakfast with his horse on the way to school) but he attended his first formal race at Newmarket in 1967, with his brother Hamdan, watching Royal Palace win the 2,000 guineas. Becoming an owner in his own right, ten years later he won his first race with Hatta at Brighton. And five years after that, he and Hamdan had three studs and 100 horses under training.

In late 1981, Mohammed purchased Gainsborough Stud at Woolton Hill, near Newbury, Berkshire, United Kingdom. He owns Ballysheehan Stud in County Tipperary, Ireland; as well as Gainsborough Farm Inc. in Versailles, Kentucky, United States. His racing operations include the ownership of Darley Stables and he is the leading partner in his family's Godolphin Stables. Mohammed hosts the Dubai World Cup at Meydan Racecourse.

By 1992, Mohammed had started 'wintering' his horses in Dubai, frequently against the advice of trainers and pundits in the UK. The results were a string of high-profile wins, and by 1994 he founded Godolphin. In 1995, his hands-on approach to racing resulted in a major split with leading trainer Henry Cecil after a disagreement over racing a horse Mohammed insisted was injured. Cecil took the argument public and Mohammed removed all his horses from Cecil's stable.

Godolphin's first win, Balanchine taking the Oaks at Epsom Downs, England, in 1994, was to mark the beginning of a winning streak with horses such as Lammtarra, Daylami, Fantastic Light, Street Cry, Sulamani, Dubawi, and Ramonti among them. Dubai Millennium, said to be Mohammed's favourite, won nine of his ten starts before succumbing to injury followed by grass sickness in 2001.

In 1996, the Dubai World Cup was inaugurated as the world's richest horserace, drawing the legendary American dirt track horse Cigar to race in Dubai. Today, held at the Meydan Racecourse, the race meeting carries a prize of $27 million.

In the UK, Mohammed's horses have won Group One races including several of the British Classic Races. His horses have also won the Irish Derby Stakes, the Prix de l'Arc de Triomphe and, the 2006 Preakness Stakes with Bernardini in the US. In 2008, he bought the Woodlands Stud empire for more than $460 million.

At the age of 63, Mohammed won the 2012 World Endurance Championship over a 160 km course. Both his thoroughbreds and endurance horses have failed drug tests – although his trainers (including Mahmood Al Zarooni) have accepted the blame. His endurance racing stable has also been involved in other scandals, including both fatal injuries, and ringers. In 2015, the FEI suspended the United Arab Emirates following a series of scandals.

In the 15th Asian Games in 2006, Mohammed's son Rashid took the individual gold in endurance riding. His sons Rashid, Ahmed, Majid, and Hamdan took the team gold in endurance riding, his niece Latifa took a bronze in show jumping, and his daughter Maitha led the UAE team in taekwondo. In 2013 when the UAE National football team won the Gulf Cup, Mohammed gave the team 50 million dirhams ($13.7 million). His wife awarded the team a further 25 million dirhams ($6.8 million), while the pair's grandsons contributed 12 million dirhams ($3.3 million).

Godolphin's Cross Counter, ridden by Kerrin McEvoy and trained by Charlie Appleby won the 2018 Melbourne Cup.

Support of the arts 
Mohammed is a poet in classical Arabic as well as the Bedouin (colloquial) Nabati style.

In 1998, Mohammed set up the Sheikh Mohammed bin Rashid Centre for Cultural Understanding (SMCCU), a not-for-profit organisation that aims to raise awareness and demystify the local culture, customs, and religion of the United Arab Emirates. Operating under the motto "Open Doors. Open Minds", SMCCU aims to improve cross-cultural understanding and communication between UAE locals and guests visiting or residing in the UAE. An initiative by Mohammed in 2015 saw Dubai's Metro stations turned into art galleries in the period leading up to Art Dubai 2015.

The sheikh established the Mohammed bin Rashid Al Maktoum Patrons of the Arts Awards in March 2009 to honour individuals and organisations who have contributed towards arts development in Dubai. The award allows artists and projects to benefit from the private sector's support under four categories: Distinguished Patrons of the Arts (AED 15 million), Patrons of the Arts (AED 2–5 million), Supporters of the Arts (AED 500,000), and Friends of the Arts (AED 50,000–500,000). The award aims to grant financial or in kind support to the visual and performing arts, literature, and film sectors, which contribute to enriching the artistic and cultural scene in Dubai.

Controversies

Sheikha Latifa and Sheikha Shamsa kidnap allegations 
 Mohammed bin Rashid Al Maktoum has three daughters named Latifa. The other two daughters are not connected to this allegation. 
An early 2000s British police investigation of allegations, made by a former riding instructor, about the attempted escape of Mohammed's daughter Latifa from her family estate in England and the subsequent kidnapping on a street in Cambridge of Latifa's sister Shamsa in 2001, was inconclusive.

On 11 March 2018, a video was released of Sheikha Latifa after her failed attempt to flee the UAE and subsequent disappearance, in which she claimed she was fleeing from her family, made allegations of abuse, and said her father was responsible for a number of murders, including the murder of his deceased older brother's wife. The escape attempt was the focus of a documentary by Australian broadcaster Nine News as well as BBC Newsnight investigation.

In December 2018, former United Nations High Commissioner for Human Rights Mary Robinson, after meeting Sheikha Latifa in the presence of other family members, said that the princess was now in the loving care of her family. Her statement was criticised by human rights groups, who said that Robinson would not have been able to tell in the meeting whether Latifa truly had psychological issues. A spokeswoman for ″The Mary Robinson Foundation – Climate Justice″ confirmed that Robinson was approached by Mohammed's wife Princess Haya bint Hussein, an old friend of Robinson's, and was requested to go to Dubai by Princess Haya and that Haya paid the fare, less than two weeks after the BBC ran a documentary detailing Sheikha Latifa's failed escape attempt in March. Robinson admits she was "horribly tricked" when photographs of the private lunch were made public and that both she and Haya had been told of details of Latifa's bipolar disorder, a condition which she does not have. Latifa's cousin Marcus Essabri reported that Latifa's photos with Mary Robinson seems to show Latifa medicated while held in Dubai under her father's orders. She has not been seen in public since.

In February 2021 video footage obtained by the BBC shows Sheikha Latifa saying she has been "a hostage" for over a year "with no access to medical help" in "solitary confinement" without access to medical or legal help in a "villa jail" with windows and doors barred shut, and guarded by police. The governments of Dubai and the UAE have not responded to requests for comment from the BBC. Despite her family's insistence that she has been enjoying time with them at home the past two years, Sheikha Latifa says in the series of videos released by her advocates that she is "a hostage" and fears for her life. "Every day, I'm worried about my safety in my life. I don't really know if I'm going to survive this situation." "The police threaten me that they would take me outside and shoot me if I didn't cooperate with them," she said. "They also threatened me that I would be in prison my whole life and I'll never see the sun again."

In 2021, investigative reporting into the Pegasus spyware found that Latifa's name was added to a list of names that were potential targets of the spyware just days before she was seized by Sheikh Mohammed's commandos on a yacht in an attempt to flee.

Princess Haya escape 

In June 2019 it was reported that one of Sheikh Mohammed's wives, Princess Haya bint Hussein, had fled Dubai and was in Germany seeking political asylum along with her children, a son and a daughter. Media reports also asserted that Haya had taken £31 million with her. The cause of the departure was unknown. A subsequent poem written by Sheikh Mohammed posted on Instagram alluded to betrayal. Haya filed for the sole custody of their two children, and a forced marriage protection order (FMPO), a non-molestation order, and non-repatriation to Dubai at the High Court of Justice in London in July 2019.

In December 2019 a UK family court ruled that on the balance of probabilities, Sheikh Mohammed had orchestrated the abductions of his daughters Latifa and Shamsa and that he continued to maintain a regime whereby both were deprived of their liberty. Also on the balance of probabilities, the court concluded that Mohammed had subjected Princess Haya to a campaign of "intimidation" and "taunted" her after her adulterous affair with a bodyguard. The findings were published in March 2020.

In October 2021, the High Court ruled that agents of Sheikh Mohammed used the Israeli Pegasus spyware to hack the phones of Princess Haya, her solicitors, a personal assistant and two members of her security team in the summer of 2020. The court ruled that the agents acted "with the express or implied authority" of the sheikh; he denied knowledge of the hacking. The judgment referred to the hacking as "serial breaches of (UK) domestic criminal law", "in violation of fundamental common law and ECHR rights", "interference with the process of this court and the mother's access to justice" and "abuse of power" by a head of state.

In December 2021, Haya was granted full custody of her children, and alimony and support in the amount of US$720 million. In 2022, the court mandated no direct contact between Mohammed and the children, and no input by him into decision-making about the children's lives.

Child camel jockeys 
In 2006, a UNICEF-sponsored program with the UAE government resulted in the repatriation of hundreds of children formerly enslaved as camel jockeys, and provided them with social services and compensation upon return to their home countries of Pakistan, Sudan, Mauritania, and Bangladesh. The UAE government set aside US$2.7 million in initial funding in 2005 with an additional $9 million for the second phase, and to enforce compliance, adopted a law officially banning the practice with penalties of jail time and a $27,200 fine. UNICEF endorsed the UAE's efforts and expressed the hopes that "the UAE's programme will serve as a model to other countries in the region, as a means of ending all forms of exploitation of children".

In September 2006, Mohammed was accused of encouraging the abduction and enslavement of thousands of boys for use as jockeys in camel races. A class-action suit was filed against him in the US state of Florida. In 2006, American lawyers representing the UAE raised a motion to dismiss the lawsuit on the grounds that none of the involved parties resided in the US, arguing that the UN program best served the interests of the children. In July 2007, judge Cecilia Altonaga accepted the motion and dismissed the suit.

Horse racing drugs scandal 
In April 2013, Mohammed's Godolphin stables trainer Mahmood Al Zarooni was disqualified for eight years from thoroughbred horse racing by the British Horseracing Authority for administering steroids to eleven racehorses. Mohammed stated that he was "appalled and angered" by the case and announced that the stable would be locked down while drug tests were carried out on all horses under Al Zarooni's care. In May, Mohammed, as prime minister of the UAE, issued a decree outlawing and criminalizing the use of anabolic steroids on horses in the UAE.

In October 2013, Mohammed faced another scandal in the venue of horseracing, with reports of potentially toxic and dangerous steroids, anaesthetics, and anti-inflammatory drugs being shipped into the UAE, mislabeled as "horse tack". The Telegraph commented that a "PR campaign is already underway, with Sheikh Mohammed again cast as a victim of employee malpractice".

Pandora Papers 
In October 2021, an investigation by the International Consortium of Investigative Journalists (ICIJ) revealed that over 330 prominent politicians and public officials across the world had ties with offshore companies. Amongst them were 35 current and former world leaders. The leaked 11.9 million files revealed that Mohammed bin Rashid Al Maktoum also used offshore companies to manage and expand his wealth. In order to carry out his dealings, he secretly registered three companies in the tax havens of the British Virgin Islands (BVI) and the Bahamas. Registered by an Emirati firm, Axiom Limited, the three companies were Tandem Investco Limited and Tandem DirectorCo Limited in BVI and Allied International Investments Limited in the Bahamas. Partly owned by the Dubai Holding, in which Sheikh Mohammed owns major shares, Axiom Limited used the three companies to “expand its core business”.

Personal life 
Sheikh Mohammed has 25 children from several wives.

Mohammed's ex-wife was Princess Haya bint Hussein, daughter of former King Hussein of Jordan and half-sister of King Abdullah II of Jordan. In 2022, the High Court of England and Wales ruled and mandated that Mohammed must not have direct contact with his children by Haya, or input into decision-making about them, because of his coercive and abusive behaviour which "had emotionally and psychologically harmed their children". On 19 September 2022, he attended the state funeral of Queen Elizabeth II at Westminster Abbey, London.

In addition to Arabic, he also speaks English.

Wealth and assets 
In 2021, the Organized Crime and Corruption Reporting Project estimated that Sheikh Mohammed owned assets worth $14 billion.

Sheikh Mohammed owns the yacht Dubai, built by the German company Blohm + Voss and designed by English designer Andrew Winch, who owns Winch Design. Another personal yacht of the Sheikh is the  Alloya, built by Sanlorenzo in 2013.

Mohammed owns real estate in the United Kingdom worth more than 100 million British pounds, as well as properties in Rome through a company registered in Luxembourg. According to a 2021 analysis by The Guardian and Transparency International, Sheikh Mohammed is one of the largest landowners in the UK, owning more than 100,000 acres. The exact number of properties is not known, as most of the properties connected to him are owned through offshore companies in the tax havens of Guernsey and Jersey. Asked about these holdings, Sheikh Mohammed's lawyer rejected that the properties were bought through offshore companies or that the holdings were intended to avoid UK taxes.

In the 2021 Pandora Papers leaks, it was revealed that Sheikh Mohammed was a shareholder in three additional companies registered in jurisdictions allowing secrecy.

Wives and children

Sheikh Mohammed is married to Sheikha Hind bint Maktoum bin Juma Al Maktoum (m. 1979, First Lady of Dubai). They have 12 children:
 Sheikha Hessa bint Mohammed Al Maktoum (born 6 November 1980), she is married to Sheikh Saeed bin Dalmook Al Maktoum and they have three children:
 Hind bint Saeed Al Maktoum (born 25 November 2009).
 Rashid bin Saeed Al Maktoum (born 20 May 2012).
 Salama bint Saeed Al Maktoum (born 17 July 2018).
 Sheikh Rashid bin Mohammed Al Maktoum (12 November 1981 – 19 September 2015). Sheikh Rashid has one son:
 Mohammed bin Rashid Al Maktoum (born 18 November 2004).
 Sheikh Hamdan bin Mohammed Al Maktoum (born 14 November 1982), Crown Prince of Dubai (since 2008). He is married to Sheikha Shaikha bint Saeed bin Thani Al Maktoum, He has three children:
 Rashid bin Hamdan Al Maktoum (born 20 May 2021).
 Shaikha bint Hamdan Al Maktoum (born 20 May 2021).
 Mohammed bin Hamdan Al Maktoum (born 25 February 2023).
 Sheikh Maktoum bin Mohammed Al Maktoum (born 24 November 1983), Deputy Ruler of Dubai (since 2008), Deputy Prime Minister of the UAE (since 2021), UAE Minister of Finance (since 2021). He is married to Sheikha Maryam bint Butti bin Maktoum Al Maktoum, and they have three daughters:
 Hind bint Maktoum Al Maktoum (born 24 November 2020).
 Latifa bint Maktoum Al Maktoum (born 11 January 2022).
 Shaikha bint Maktoum Al Maktoum (born 25 January 2023).
 Sheikh Ahmed bin Mohammed Al Maktoum (born 7 February 1987). He is married to Sheikha Madiyah bint Dalmook Al Maktoum. They have one daughter:
 Hind bint Ahmed Al Maktoum (born 22 October 2022).
 Sheikh Saeed bin Mohammed Al Maktoum (born 20 March 1988).
 Sheikha Latifa bint Mohammed Al Maktoum (III) (born 30 March 1989). She is married to Sheikh Mohammed bin Hamad bin Mohammed Al Sharqi, Crown Prince of Fujairah, and they have five children:
 Hamad bin Mohammed Al Sharqi (born 29 December 2009).
 Aisha bint Mohammed Al Sharqi (born 1 November 2011).
 Fatima bint Mohammed Al Sharqi (born 11 March 2014).
 Rashid bin Mohammed Al Sharqi (born 15 December 2015).
 Hind bint Mohammed Al Sharqi (born 22 June 2020).
 Sheikha Maryam bint Mohammed Al Maktoum (II) (born 11 January 1992). She is married to Sheikh Khaled bin Mohammed bin Hamdan Al Nahyan, and they have three sons:
 Mohammed bin Khaled Al Nahyan (born 25 September 2020).
 Hamdan bin Khaled Al Nahyan (born 25 August 2021).
 Khalifa bin Khaled Al Nahyan (born 10 October 2022).
 Sheikha Shaikha bint Mohammed Al Maktoum (born 20 December 1992). She is married to Sheikh Nasser bin Hamad Al Khalifa, and they have five children:
 Sheema bint Nasser Al Khalifa (born 16 July 2010).
 Hamad bin Nasser Al Khalifa (born 6 June 2012).
 Mohammed bin Nasser Al Khalifa (born 6 June 2012).
 Hamdan bin Nasser Al Khalifa (born 28 October 2018).
 Khalid bin Nasser Al Khalifa (born 15 February 2022).
 Sheikha Futtaim bint Mohammed Al Maktoum (born 22 July 1994).
 Sheikha Salamah bint Mohammed Al Maktoum (born 8 August 1999).
 Sheikha Shamma bint Mohammed Al Maktoum (born 13 November 2001).

Sheikh Mohammed was married to Princess Haya bint Hussein (marriage 10 April 2004, divorce 7 February 2019), they have two children:
Sheikha Al Jalila bint Mohammed Al Maktoum (born 2 December 2007).
Sheikh Zayed bin Mohammed Al Maktoum (born 7 January 2012).

Sheikh Mohammed was married to Sheikha Randa bint Mohammed Al-Banna (marriage 1972, divorced). They have one daughter:
 Sheikha Manal bint Mohammed Al Maktoum (born 12 November 1977). She is married to Sheikh Mansour bin Zayed Al Nahyan, and they five children:
 Fatima bint Mansour Al Nahyan (born 9 June 2006).
 Mohammed bin Mansour Al Nahyan (born 4 December 2007).
 Hamdan bin Mansour Al Nahyan (born 21 June 2011).
 Latifa bint Mansour Al Nahyan (born 23 January 2014).
 Rashid bin Mansoor Al Nahyan (born 22 March 2017).

Sheikh Mohammed was married to Sheikha Delila Aloula (divorced), they have three daughters:
 Sheikha Dalal bint Mohammed Al Maktoum
 Sheikha Latifa bint Mohammed Al Maktoum (I) (born 16 June 1983). She is married to Sheikh Faisal bin Saud bin Khalid Al Qassimi and they have three children:
 Mohammed bin Faisal Al Qassimi (born 28 July 2018).
 Shaikha bint Faisal Al Qassimi (born 29 October 2020).
 Hamdan bin Faisal Al Qassimi (born 24 December 2021).
 Sheikha Maryam bint Mohammed Al Maktoum (I) (born 11 August 1987). She is married to Sheikh Suhail bin Ahmed Al Maktoum and they have three children:
 Fatima bint Suhail Al Maktoum (born 26 September 2019).
 Ahmed bin Suhail Al Maktoum (born 1 December 2020).
 Latifa bint Suhail Al Maktoum (born 17 February 2022).

Sheikh Mohammed was married to Sheikha Houria Ahmed Lamara (divorced), they have five children:
 Sheikha Maitha bint Mohammed Al Maktoum (born 5 March 1980).
 Sheikha Shamsa bint Mohammed Al Maktoum (born 15 August 1981).
 Sheikha Latifa bint Mohammed Al Maktoum (II) (born 5 December 1985).
 Sheikh Majid bin Mohammed Al Maktoum (born 16 October 1987). He is married to Hessa Beljafla and they have five children:
 Mohammed bin Majid Al Maktoum (born 15 July 2015).
 Dubai bint Majid Al Maktoum (born 15 July 2015).
 Maitha bint Majid Al Maktoum (born 17 May 2017).
 Rashid bin Majid Al Maktoum (born 2 February 2019).
 Maktoum bin Majid Al Maktoum (born 15 July 2022). 
 Sheikh Mansoor bin Mohammed Al Maktoum (born 26 June 1989).

Sheikh Mohammed has a son from a separate marriage (divorced):
 Sheikh Marwan bin Mohammed Al Maktoum (born 20 March 1981). He is married to Dalal Al Marzouqi and they have two sons:
 Mohammed bin Marwan Al Maktoum
 Rashid bin Marwan Al Maktoum (born 18 June 2013)

Sheikh Mohammed was married to Mrs. Zoe Grigorakos (divorced). They have one daughter:
 Sheikha Mahra bint Mohammed Al Maktoum (born 26 February 1994).

Honours
 : Collar of the Order of the Southern Cross awarded by President Jair Bolsonaro (12 November 2021).
 : Honorary Knight Grand Cross of the Order of St Michael and St George (GCMG) awarded by Queen Elizabeth II (25 November 2010).

Ancestry

See also 
 Mohammed bin Rashid Al Maktoum Solar Park
 Timeline of Dubai

References

Further reading 
  Vision for governance.
  Talks about UAE independence & union.
  A number of insights into policy, attitude & approach to leadership.
 Dubai The Maktoum Story by John M. Smith; in English; a book which criticizes the governance of Sheikh Mohammed

External links 

Official website of the UAE Government 
The Official Website of the Prime Minister of the United Arab Emirates
His Highness Sheikh Mohammed bin Rashid Al Maktoum
Vision 2021

1949 births
Living people
Eclipse Award winners
Emirati billionaires
Emirati businesspeople
Emirati politicians
Emirati racehorse owners and breeders
Emirati Muslims
Emirati Sunni Muslims
Defense ministers of the United Arab Emirates
Honorary Knights Grand Cross of the Order of the British Empire
Honorary Knights Grand Cross of the Order of St Michael and St George
Mohammed
Owners of Prix de l'Arc de Triomphe winners
Prime Ministers of the United Arab Emirates
Rulers of Dubai
People named in the Pandora Papers